Deputy Surgeon-General Sir Robert William Jackson  (1826 – 12 May 1921) was a British Army surgeon. He was knighted at Windsor Castle on 30 November 1882.

References

External links
http://www.1879zuluwar.com/t9232-sir-robert-william-jackson
Obituary, British Medical Journal, May 21, 1921

Knights Bachelor
Royal Army Medical Corps officers
Companions of the Order of the Bath
British Army personnel of the Crimean War
British Army personnel of the Anglo-Zulu War
British military personnel of the Indian Rebellion of 1857
1826 births
1921 deaths